Powle is a surname. Notable people with the surname include:

Henry Powle (1630–1692), English lawyer and politician
Richard Powle (1628–1678), English lawyer and politician

See also
Pole (surname)
Poole (surname)
Powles
Powley